Collins Chesterfield Jones Jr. (October 15, 1922 – November 11, 1991), sometimes listed as "Collis", was an American Negro league infielder in the 1940s.

A native of Macon, Georgia, Jones made his Negro leagues debut in 1943 with the Cincinnati Clowns and Harrisburg–St. Louis Stars. He went on to play for the Birmingham Black Barons the following two seasons. Jones died in Detroit, Michigan in 1991 at age 69.

References

External links
 and Seamheads

1922 births
1991 deaths
Birmingham Black Barons players
Cincinnati Clowns players
Harrisburg Stars players
Baseball players from Georgia (U.S. state)
Sportspeople from Macon, Georgia
20th-century African-American sportspeople
Baseball infielders